Deconstruction is the third studio album by American singer-songwriter Meredith Brooks. It was released on September 28, 1999, by Capitol Records. Following the album's disappointing commercial reception, Brooks was dropped from the record label.

Recording
Unlike her involvement with Meredith Brooks (1986) and Blurring the Edges (1997), Brooks sought to take more control over the compositions on Deconstruction. With the exception of "Lay Down (Candles in the Rain)", Brooks wrote or co-wrote and played lead guitar on every song on the album, in addition to co-producing the album with David Darling. Thematically, Brooks claims that the material on Deconstruction was a direct reaction to her experiences with the success of "Bitch". She explained: "The new album is about deconstructing everything, letting people know that I'm not just any one thing."

Release and promotion
Deconstruction was released on September 28, 1999. Prior to the album's release, Brooks released rough mixes of several album tracks on her official website. Fans had the opportunity to vote for their favorite songs and discuss the then-upcoming album with Brooks on the site's message board.

In an effort to promote the album, Brooks opened for the Eurythmics on their Peace Tour (1999).

Critical reception

Tom Demalon of AllMusic referred to the album as "another pleasant if somewhat derivative helping of adult rock [from Brooks]." Demalon highlighted "Nobody's Home" and "I Said" as the standout tracks from the album. Beth Johnson of Entertainment Weekly remarked that the album starts off strong with "Shout," before delving into "sound-alikes of Sheryl Crow, late-'90s Madonna, and (oh so annoyingly) Blondie's rap."

Commercial performance
In the United States, Deconstruction was considered a commercial disappointment in comparison to Brooks' previous effort, Blurring the Edges. Deconstruction failed to chart on the Billboard 200 chart and the album only sold approximately 20,000 units over two months after release.

Track listing

Personnel 
Credits are adapted from the liner notes of Deconstruction.

Production

 Meredith Brooks – vocals, writer, producer
 David Darling – producer, programming
 Melanie Safka – writer
 Queen Latifah – vocals, writer
 Larry Dvoskin – writer
 Shelly Peiken – writer
 Rick Nowels – writer
 Adam Gorgoni – writer
 Brian Reeves – engineering
 Scott Humphries – mixing

 Paul Fox – producer
 Jeff Tomei – engineering
 Mark Needham – mixing
 Tom Weir – engineering
 John Bogosian – engineering
 David Bryant – assistant engineer
 Michael Parnell – assistant engineer
 Chris Lord-Alge – mixing
 Matt Silva – mixing assistant
 Steve Genewick – mixing assistant
 Doug Sax – mastering

Instruments

 Meredith Brooks – guitars
 Rob Ladd – drums
 Paul Bushnell – drums, bass
 Michael Parnell – keyboards
 David Darling – percussion, keyboards, bass
 Paul Trudeau – percussion, keyboards, piano

 Crenshaw High School Elite Choir – background vocals
 Mark Meadows – bass
 Matt Laug – drums
 David Faragher – bass
 Arlen Shirebaum – keyboards
 Denny Fongheiser – drums
 Rami Jaffe – keyboards

Charts

Notes

Meredith Brooks albums
1999 albums